North Berwick in Haddingtonshire was a royal burgh that returned one commissioner to the Parliament of Scotland and to the Convention of Estates.

After the Acts of Union 1707, North Berwick, Dunbar, Haddington, Jedburgh and Lauder formed the Haddington district of burghs, returning one member between them to the House of Commons of Great Britain.

List of burgh commissioners

 1639–41, 1643–44, 1644–45: George Home of Wedderburn
 1649–51: John Levington 
 1661-63: Adam Maxwell, merchant-burgess 
 1665 convention: George Trotter 
1667 convention: not represented
 1669–74: Sir Andrew Ramsay of Abbotshall
 1678 convention, 1681–82, 1685–86: Charles Maitland, merchant-burgess, bailie 
 1689 convention, 1689–98: Sir Thomas Steuart of Coltness (died 1698)
 1698–1702: Sir Robert Stewart of Allanbank
 1702–07: Sir Hew Dalrymple of North Berwick

References

See also
 List of constituencies in the Parliament of Scotland at the time of the Union

Constituencies of the Parliament of Scotland (to 1707)
Politics of East Lothian
History of East Lothian
Constituencies disestablished in 1707
1707 disestablishments in Scotland
North Berwick